The Impavido class were the second group of destroyers built for the Italian Navy after World War II and the first Italian guided missile destroyers. Similar in performance to the US Navy's , these ships were essentially improved  vessels, with the after gun-turret being replaced by a Tartar surface-to-air-missile launcher and associated radar.

Two ships were constructed in the 1960s in Italy, Impavido and Intrepido. They were in active service until the ships were retired in 1991 and 1992 respectively.

Design 
The Impavido  class were the first guided missile destroyers of the Italian Navy. The vessels were commissioned in the early 1960s and were roughly equal to the American Charles F. Adams-class destroyer. Both classes shared the Tartar missile system, with a Mk 13 launcher, and carried around 40 missiles. They had two fire control radars to guide their weaponry and all this was fitted in the aft of the ship. Both classes also had two single  guns, but the American ships had these in single mountings and in a new model, the Mk 42, one fore and the other aft, while the Impavidos made use of an older Mk 38 dual turret.

One difference between the classes was the secondary weaponry. While both had lightweight torpedo launchers, the rest was different. The Charles F. Adams class had an ASROC launcher, dedicated to anti-submarine warfare tasks, to help counter the growing number of Soviet submarines. The Impavidos did not have such systems, but instead had four model MM (Marina Militare)  guns. In the Mediterranean Sea, where the ships were intended to operate, there was always the danger of air attacks as the main threat to ships. This usually led to the construction of many Italian warships with a heavier short-range air defence armament than normal.

In service the MM guns were not considered satisfactory, despite having decisive improvements over the older American 76 mm guns. Reliability left a lot to be desired, while the lack of a totally automatic mode of fire proved a disadvantage.

A characteristic of these ships were the superstructures, having a much less clean layout than other classes. They had a double line of windows in the main turrion, similar to the s.

They became progressively obsolescent, not receiving any important updates in their service lives.

Ships

Notes

Sources 
 Blackman, Raymond V.B. Jane's Fighting Ships 1971–72. London: Sampson Low Marston & Co, 1971. .
 Gardiner, Robert and Stephen Chumbley (editors). Conway's All The World's Fighting Ships 1947–1995. Annapolis, Maryland, USA: Naval Institute Press, 1995. .

External links 

 Destroyer Impavido Marina Militare website

 
Destroyers of the Italian Navy
Destroyer classes
Cold War naval ships of Italy
1962 ships